South Canberra, or the Inner South, is a central district of Canberra, the capital city of Australia.

South Canberra is located to the south of Canberra's city centre and is on the south bank of Lake Burley Griffin.

It is one of the oldest parts of Canberra and is built in part in accordance to Walter Burley Griffin's designs. Unlike the later districts in Canberra that are built as separate satellite cities, South Canberra is only separated from North Canberra only by Lake Burley Griffin. The two districts combined form the district of Central Canberra and share Civic as their central commercial area.

Places of note

 Australia's Parliament House on Capital Hill.
 Parkes contains the Parliamentary Triangle area.
 Government House the official residence of the governor general.

Sites of significance 
In 1984 the National Capital Development Commission commissioned the identification and documentation of sites of significance in the ACT.  The results for Inner Canberra were published in 1988.  Sites with both natural and cultural significance were identified.  Many of these are listed on the ACT Heritage Register.

Cultural sites of significance:

 Barton: Old Parliament House; Patent Offices (now the Sir Robert Garran Offices housing the Attorney-General's Department); Brassey House; Barton urban conservation area
 Deakin: The Lodge
 Kingston: Kingston shops (Eastlake Shopping  Centre); Kingston Power House; Federal Capital Commission houses
 Forrest: Forrest urban conservation area; Street sign; Forrest residences
 Manuka: Housing group; St Christopher's school and convent; Manuka swimming pool; Manuka oval - curator's residence
 Red Hill: House 67, Arthur Circle; Calthorpes' House
 Yarralumla: Bus shelter: Schlich Street (destroyed by fire since identification); Surveyors hut; Albert Hall; Hotel Canberra; Australian Forestry School; Old Canberra Brickworks; Canberra Incinerator; Westbourne Woods; Government House

Natural sites of significance:
 Deakin anticlines
 Rutidosis leptorrhynchoides habitats
 State Circle road cutting
 Red Hill geological site
 Narrabundah Tors
 Hindmarsh Drive road cuttings

Demographics
Aboriginal and Torres Strait Islander people made up 1.3% of the population, which was lower than the national and territory averages. The median age of people in South Canberra was 40 years, which was slightly higher than the national median of 38 years. Children aged 0–14 years made up 13.7% of the population and people aged 65 years and over made up 18.5% of the population. Of people in the area aged 15 years and over, 45.2% were married and 10.6% were either divorced or separated.

Population growth in South Canberra was slower than the national average during the first 10 years (national average for each five year period was 5.8% and 8.3% respectively), but it has been significantly faster since (the national average was 8.8% and 8.6% in the last two periods). The median weekly income for residents within South Canberra was significantly higher than the national and territory averages.

Representation
The Inner South is part of the Division of Canberra in the Australian House of Representatives and is currently represented by Alicia Payne. As of 2020, most of the Inner South is represented in the Australian Capital Territory Legislative Assembly by 5 members representing Kurrajong. Deakin and Yarralumla are represented by 5 members representing Murrumbidgee.

Inner South Canberra Community Council:  The Inner South Canberra Community Council (ISCCC)  is a voluntary, not for profit, community-based association operating in the inner south area of Canberra, in the Australian Capital Territory. The ISCCC is recognised by the ACT Government as a peak community body representing the interests of the local residents, businesses and organisations.  The ISCCC’s objective is to preserve and improve the social, cultural, economic and environmental well being of Inner South Canberra and the Inner South Canberra community. The ISCCC Is not a local government.

References

External links
 Canberra region map - all districts 

Districts of the Australian Capital Territory